Colonel James Henry Deakin (2 March 1823 – 23 September 1880) was a British Conservative Party politician and brewer.

He was elected MP for Launceston in the 1874 general election but was unseated just under three months later, owing to corruption, including allowing his tenants to "kill rabbits the eve of the election", causing a by-election. His son James Henry Deakin (junior) was elected in his place at the ensuing by-election.

In 1871, Deakin bought the Werrington manor from Wicklow MP William Wentworth FitzWilliam Dick, selling off much of the land and properties of the estate. In 1882, the manor and its lands were then purchased by John Charles Williams.

Deakin was an Honorary Colonel of the 33rd Lancashire Volunteers.

References

Conservative Party (UK) MPs for English constituencies
UK MPs 1874–1880
1823 births
1880 deaths
Members of the Parliament of the United Kingdom for Launceston